Red Warrior is an unincorporated community and coal town in Kanawha County, West Virginia, United States.

References 

Unincorporated communities in West Virginia
Unincorporated communities in Kanawha County, West Virginia
Coal towns in West Virginia